John Stuart Skinner (22 February 1788 – 21 March 1851) was an American lawyer, publisher, and editor. During his life he held several civil and government positions. He is associated with farming, domesticated animals, and agricultural management and his publishing interests specialized in outdoor sports, especially those dealing with horses.

Skinner was involved with various aspects of the War of 1812. One involved a rescue mission with Francis Scott Key to retrieve a doctor being held as a prisoner by the British. Key wrote a poem about a part of the mission and Skinner had his poem published. This eventually lead to the poem becoming the American national anthem "The Star-Spangled Banner".

Early life 

John Stuart Skinner was born in Maryland on February 22, 1788. He was the son of Frederick Skinner and a descendant of Robert Skinner, who arrived in Maryland in the early 1600s. Skinner lived on a 600 acre family estate referred to as "The Reserve" that was on the peninsula between the Patuxent River and the Chesapeake bay. In his childhood he spent his time following his father around his various other farms he owned in Maryland or following his father's slaves as they went about their duties. The atmosphere was rural and as a young man he was exposed to horseback riding, hunting, fishing, and trapping. One farm he often went to was on 700 acres near the Calvert County courthouse where he learned husbandry and agriculture and studied the science of agronomy.

Skinner received his formal education as a teenager at Charlotte Hall School in St. Mary's County, Maryland. It was an academy-style faculty having courses in preparation for further education. He became assistant to the clerk of the Calvert County at the age of 18 in 1806 and was promoted to the reading clerk in the Maryland State Legislature shortly thereafter. Governor Robert Wright in 1807 appointed Skinner notary public for Annapolis, Maryland. He studied law and began practice as a lawyer at the age of 21 in 1809 when he was admitted to the bar. Three years later he was a government agent processing mail and supplies of European ships during the War of 1812 as an inspector of all packets going to Europe from the United States. For the position President James Madison established a special commission and assigned Skinner to personally handle the enforcement of all inspections. He was also promoted to become the administrator for prisoners-of-war, giving him a total combined yearly pay of $1,800.

In 1813 Skinner moved his law offices from Annapolis to Baltimore. He then accepted a purser's commission in the navy's Chesapeake Bay Flotilla under captain Joshua Barney. These government positions and social activities established lifelong friendships with many of the most notable state political figures and gained him favorable recognition from both British and American government officials. Skinner earned a high annual income from all these positions.

Events in 1814 
As the prisoner-of-war exchange officer, Skinner was selected in early September along with Francis Scott Key by President Madison for a mission to obtain the release of Dr. William Beanes who was being held prisoner by the British. Skinner and Key sailed from Baltimore down the Chesapeake Bay in a flag of truce cartel vessel to find the British fleet. They found and went on board Rear Admiral Alexander Cochrane's flagship  on September 7 while the ship was anchored near the Potomac River. They were carrying a flag of truce and a letter from American General John Mason (the commissary general of prisoners) to Admiral Cochrane and General Ross describing F.S.Key as "a citizen of the highest respectability" who had been authorized along with Skinner to seek Beanes's release. Referring to Beanes, Mason wrote: "He is far advanced in life, infirmed: and unaccustomed to privations by which he must now suffer severely." Skinner with Key pleaded with Major General Robert Ross who, although was reluctant at first, was finally moved by letters Key had brought from wounded British soldiers, from the Battle of Bladensburg, telling of the excellent care they had received from American doctors . 

Although he was released that day, Beanes along with Skinner and Key were not allowed to return because they had overheard the plans to attack Baltimore  while being on board Tonnant that day. They were immediately transferred to another British warship, the frigate , as the fleet slowly moved toward Baltimore. They were finally returned to their own sloop on September 11. The sloop was tethered to a British ship that eventually moved in with the attack squadron about 3 miles from Fort McHenry and guarded by British marines to prevent escape.

Skinner and Key were allowed to watch the attack on Fort McHenry from their ship, still under guard. On the morning of September 13 at dawn the British bombardment of Baltimore began. The city was defended by Fort McHenry in the harbor. Skinner, Key, and Beanes watched the attack and saw a huge American flag made by Mary Pickersgill flying above Fort McHenry as a representation of the American resolve to defend Baltimore. A smaller storm flag was then used through most of the battle during a prolonged thunder storm.  The bombardment went into the night with Skinner and his companions not knowing how the battle was going. When the smoke cleared on the morning of September 14, the American spectators were able to see the huge garrison flag again raised over the fort. Fort McHenry had not been taken by the British. On their way back to Baltimore, Key was inspired to write a poem, "Defence of Fort M'Henry", that he showed Skinner who passed it on to Samuel Sands, a printer's assistant. Sands had the poem printed up in handbills and the words became the lyrics of the American national anthem, "The Star-Spangled Banner".

After the war 
Skinner was one of a group that formed the Maryland State Agricultural Society. It held its first exhibition near Lexington Market in 1820. At the time he advocated a system for the establishment of a stock farm for the improvement of breeds of domestic animals through farm management. With the aid and participation of Major Isaac McKim and others in 1821 they had organized the 200-acre Maryland Tavern that held semi-annual animal fairs for the sale of animals from around the world. The Society in October 1824 had a special fair in honor of Lafayette for his services in the Revolutionary War. He happened to be visiting Baltimore at the time. Skinner was in charge of this fair and also entertained LaFayette at his home. In November the United States government rewarded Lafayette for his services with ownership of an entire township in Florida.

In 1825 Skinner had been awarded the militia rank of Governor's aide with the title of colonel and made secretary of a group organized to determine the practicality of building a canal to unite Baltimore with the Chesapeake and Ohio Canal to Pittsburgh, then on to Lake Erie. Although it would have opened up western and northern areas to industry and commerce, the canal never materialized because of expense. In 1827 Skinner became a member of the House of Delegates.

Personal life 
On March 10, 1812 Skinner married Elizabeth G. Davies, the step-daughter of Theodorick Bland, Chancellor of Maryland. They lived at the Old Town district of Baltimore on Albemarle Street at Plowman Street. Skinner was a personal friend of Thomas Jefferson, Andrew Jackson, James Monroe, and James Madison. Madison appointed him postmaster of the city of Baltimore in 1816, a position he held for 20 years. They entertained presidents and high ranking government officials at the home they moved into in 1818 at No. 8 South Calvert Street. They shared their home with the post-office, which was a first-floor room they rented out to the government.

Publications 

Skinner first published the periodical American Farmer in 1819. It was the first continuous agricultural periodical in the United States. The first issue came out on April 2 and attained immediate success. He had distributorships in Philadelphia, New York City, Boston, and many of the major cities in Virginia and North Carolina. During the first week of publication over 700 subscriptions were sold. The periodical was well-respected and the Baltimore American newspaper paid a special tribute to Skinner. The articles he created in American Farmer covered a wide array of agricultural subjects of interest to the American farmer.

Skinner wrote a series called "Notices for a Young Farmer" that spoke about efficient land management and farming with only a few efficient slaves instead of many uncoordinated ones. He showed the importance of the farm to the development and advancement of the new nation. Noted farmers and merchants contributed articles to his periodical like Jefferson, Jackson, Edmund Ruffin, Timothy Pickering, Thomas M. Randolph, John H. Cooke and John Randolph of Roanoke. After 10 years, Skinner sold the American Farmer for $20,000 to the I. Irvine Hitchcock Company of Baltimore.

In 1829 Skinner started The American Turf Register and Sporting Magazine dedicated to covering the blooded horse and racing. Perley Poore's biography on Skinner says that the horses rose in value from $100 to well over $5,000 after their pedigrees were printed in this magazine . The publication had fifty pages and was a subscription of five dollars per year. It had ornamental covers with engravings of horses or games. A group of horsemen once presented Skinner with an expensive silver dinner-plate service set to honor his publication. After several years of successful publication he sold the periodical for $10,000 to a Mr. Pegram of Petersburg, Virginia.

Skinner in 1845 began a new publication, the Farmer's Library and Monthly Journal of Agriculture. This was succeeded in 1848 by the Plough, Loom, and Anvil, which he published until his death. Skinner's publications gave a new stimulus to agricultural pursuits and added to the general popularity of outdoor sports. Surviving copies have become collectors' items. In his time period he was considered a one-man Department of Agriculture and advocated through his publications crop rotation and intelligent fertilization.

Later life and death 

Skinner and his wife went to Washington in February, 1851, to visit their son, Frederick Gustavus Skinner, who had been appointed chief of the Agricultural Bureau of the Patent Office by President Zachary Taylor. On their way home they decided to stop in Baltimore to visit some friends. In the afternoon of March 21 he dropped in at the Baltimore post office and upon leaving mistook the exit door and fell through an entrance to the basement. He fell headlong to the hard basement floor suffering a compound fracture of the skull. He never regained consciousness and died in the postmaster's office several hours later. He is buried in a vault in the Old Westminster churchyard in Baltimore.

Footnotes

References 

 
 
 

 
 

1788 births
1851 deaths
Maryland lawyers
People from Carroll County, Maryland
The Star-Spangled Banner
19th-century American lawyers